Agustín Alberto Martegani (born 20 May 2000) is an Argentine professional footballer who plays for San Lorenzo de Almagro in the Argentine Primera División.

Career
Martegani joined San Lorenzo de Almagro in 2017 having played as a younger player with his 
local Club Atlético Argentino de Rojas. He made his debut for San Lorenzo in the Copa Argentina against Club Sportivo Estudiantes on 22 May, 2019. On 11 October, 2021 Martegani scored his first league goal with a left footed strike in a 2-1 victory over Club Atlético Colón. 

Martegiani had played 18 matches and scored 3 goals during the 2022 season when he was left out by manager Rubén Darío Insúa for a match against Tigre in June 2022 following a transfer offer thought to be in the region of $4million from Flamengo. San Lorenzo also reported an offer of €4million came in from Hellas Verona for his services which was rejected as insufficient. However, after no transfer was agreed Insua said he welcomed Martegani back into his squad for the remainder of 2022.

Style of play 
A left-footed playmaker, Martegani has been praised for his dribbling, through balls and ability to shoot from range.

References

External links

 

2000 births
Living people
Argentine footballers
Association football midfielders
Argentine Primera División players
Category : San Lorenzo de Almagro footballers